Formula Dream was an open wheel racing series based in Japan. The series was replaced by Formula Challenge Japan in 2006.

Champions

See also
Formula Nippon
Formula Challenge Japan

References

External links
Formula Dream at forix.com

Formula racing series
Formula racing
Auto racing series in Japan
Recurring sporting events established in 1999
Recurring events disestablished in 2005
Defunct auto racing series